Rafael Bilú Mudesto (born 21 April 1999), known as Rafael Bilú, is a Brazilian footballer who plays as an winger for Cruzeiro.

Career
Rafael Bilú came through the youth ranks at Corinthians. He represented the club in both 2018 and 2019 editions of Copa São Paulo de Futebol Júnior. On 25 November 2018, he made his senior debut in the Campeonato Brasileiro Série A game against Chapecoense, coming on as a late substitute in the 0–0 draw.

On 22 May 2019, he moved on loan to América Mineiro until the end of the 2019 season.

References

External links
 

Living people
1999 births
Brazilian footballers
Footballers from São Paulo
Association football midfielders
Sport Club Corinthians Paulista players
América Futebol Clube (MG) players
Centro Sportivo Alagoano players
Mirassol Futebol Clube players
Esporte Clube Juventude players
Criciúma Esporte Clube players
Campeonato Brasileiro Série A players
Campeonato Brasileiro Série B players